The 2017 Puskás Cup was the tenth edition of the Puskás Cup, an invitational under-17 association football tournament, that took place from 2 June to 5 June in Felcsút, Hungary. Budapest Honvéd were the defending champions. The tournament was organized by Puskás Akadémia and all matches were once again played at the team's home stadium, Pancho Arena.

Participating teams
 Bayern Munich
 Budapest Honvéd 
 Panathinaikos 
 Real Madrid 
 Puskás Akadémia (host)
 Sporting CP

Venues

Results

Group A

Group B

Fifth place play-off

Third place play-off

Final

Statistics

Goalscorers
3 goals  
  László Kecskeméti (Budapest Honvéd)
2 goals
  Emanoulidis (Panathinaikos)
1 goal 
  Belmonte (Real Madrid)
  Cardoso (Sporting CP)
  Christodoulou (Panathinaikos)
  Del Álamo (Real Madrid)
  ill. Inácio (Sporting CP)
  Khallack (Real Madrid)
  Marin (Real Madrid)
  Nieto (Real Madrid)
  Park (Real Madrid)
  Rui Reis (Sporting CP)
  Silva (Sporting CP)
  Filipe Sissé (Sporting CP)
  Adriano Skenterai (Panathinaikos)
  Nándor Tamás (Budapest Honvéd)
  Norbert Szendrei (Budapest Honvéd)
  Norman Timári (Puskás Akadémia)
  Vallo (Real Madrid)

Own goals
  Áron Csibi (Budapest Honvéd) against Puskás Akadémia

References

External links
Official website

2017
2016–17 in Spanish football
2016–17 in Hungarian football
2016–17 in Greek football
2016–17 in German football
2016–17 in Portuguese football
June 2017 sports events in Europe
2017 in association football